Khabaristan Times (KT) was a Pakistani digital news satire publication, run by journalists Kunwar Khuldune Shahid and Luavut Zahid, who were the brains behind the content. Shahid was the editor of the publication, while Zahid took up responsibilities as the CEO. The website published satirical articles on national and local issues. The website was blocked for viewership within Pakistan by the Pakistan Telecommunication Authority on January 25, 2017.

Khabaristan Times was a renowned satire and parody website with its commentary on Pakistani politics and the military. In 2015, a satirical piece by the website went viral and was reported by the annual symposium Women in the World and international medial outlets. In 2017, KT was reportedly blocked in Pakistan. Khabaristan Times ceased to exist in April 2017.

See also	
 List of satirical news websites

References

Satirical websites
Defunct Pakistani websites
2014 establishments in Pakistan
Internet properties established in 2014
Internet properties disestablished in 2017
Censorship in Pakistan